Sanjeev Goyal FBA is an Indian-British economist who is currently Arthur C. Pigou Professor of Economics at the University of Cambridge and a Fellow of Christ's College, Cambridge. He received a BA (Honours, 1983) from Delhi University and an MA (1989) and PhD (1990) from Cornell University, all in economics. He is a pioneer and a leading international scholar in the economic study of networks. His 2007 book Connections: an introduction to the economics of networks (2007) was published by Princeton University Press; a new book, Networks: An Economics Approach is to be published by MIT Press.

Sanjeev Goyal is a Fellow of the British Academy and Fellow of the Econometric Society. He was the founding Director of the Cambridge-INET Institute (2012–2014) and Chair of the Cambridge Economics Faculty (2014–2018).

References
 V. Bala and S. Goyal (1998), Learning From Neighbors, Review of Economic Studies.
 V. Bala  and S. Goyal (2000), A Non-Cooperative Model of Network Formation, Econometrica.
 S. Goyal and J.L. Moraga (2001), R&D Networks, RAND Journal.
 S. Goyal and S. Joshi (2003), Networks of Collaboration in Oligopoly, Games and Econ Beh.
 S. Goyal and  F. Vega-Redondo (2005), Network formation and social coordination, Games and Econ Beh..
 
 S. Goyal and F. Vega-Redondo (2007), Structural Holes in Social networks, Journal of Economic Theory.
 A. Galeotti and S. Goyal (2009), Influencing and influencers: a theory of strategic diffusion, RAND Journal.
 A. Galeotti, S. Goyal, M. Jackson, F. Vega-Redondo, L. Yariv (2010), Network Games, Review of Economic Studies.
 A. Galeotti and  S. Goyal (2010), The Law of the Few, American Economic Review.
 S. Goyal and M. Kearns (2012), Competitive Contagion in Networks, Symposium on the Theory of Computing.
 L. Ductor, M.Fafchamps, S. Goyal and M. v.d.Leij (2014), Social Networks & Research Output, Rev of Econ and Stats.
 S. Goyal and A. Vigier (2014), Attack, defence and contagion in networks, Review of Economic Studies.
 M. Dziubinski and S. Goyal (2016), How do you defend a network?, Theoretical Economics.
 J. Gagnon and S. Goyal (2017), Networks, markets and inequality, American Economic Review
 P. Dasgupta and S. Goyal (2019), Narrow Identities, Journal of Institutional and Theoretical Economics.
 A. Galeotti, B. Golub and S. Goyal (2020), Targeting Interventions in Networks, Econometrica.
 L. Ductor, S. Goyal and A. Prummer (2022), Gender and Collaboration, Review of Econ. and Stats.

External links 
 Goyal's official page;

Fellows of Christ's College, Cambridge
Fellows of the British Academy
Fellows of the Econometric Society
Cornell University alumni
20th-century Indian economists
Hindu College, Delhi alumni
Living people
Year of birth missing (living people)